G N' R Lies (also known simply as Lies) is the second studio album by American hard rock band Guns N' Roses and was released on November 29, 1988, by Geffen Records. It is the band's shortest studio album, running at 33 and a half minutes. The album reached number two on the US Billboard 200, and according to the RIAA, the album has shipped over five million copies in the United States.

"Patience" was the only single released from Lies, and peaked at number four on the Billboard Hot 100. This is their last full album to feature drummer Steven Adler following his departure in 1990, shortly after the single "Civil War" was recorded, and featured on Use Your Illusion II (1991), as well as their last album to be recorded as five-piece band members.

Background and recording

Live ?!*@ Like a Suicide

The first four tracks consist of the previously released EP Live ?!*@ Like a Suicide. These four tracks were also included as bonus tracks on the 2018 reissue of Appetite for Destruction.

G N' R Lies 
The last four songs were recorded with acoustic guitars. They were written and recorded in only a few studio sessions (with the exception of "You're Crazy", which appeared in an alternative version on Appetite for Destruction), which producer Mike Clink called "one of those magical rock and roll history moments".

In later interviews, Axl Rose stated that while he loved how the band sounded on the last four songs, he hated the sound of his voice. Rose recalled that his voice was husky and scratchy from the band's lengthy touring at the time, and if he could he would have re-recorded his vocal tracks in a separate session.

A significantly faster version of "You're Crazy" with electric guitars had previously been released on the band's debut album, Appetite for Destruction, and was now recorded as originally intended. 
"Used to Love Her" was written as a joke after Izzy Stradlin disliked a song he heard on the radio featuring "some guy whining about a broad who was treating him bad". Slash stated that "People think it's about one of our old girlfriends, but it's actually about Axl's dog."

Three of the four songs from the G N' R Lies EP are included on the 2018 remastered release of the album Appetite for Destruction, with the exception of the controversial "One in a Million".

Artwork

The cover is a parody of tabloid newspapers, as are the liner notes. The album's cover art underwent several minor modifications when the title was released on CD. First, in the bottom left corner reading "LIES LIES LIES" originally read "Wife-beating has been around for 10,000 years." Secondly, instead of "Elephant gives birth to midget", the original headline reads, "Ladies, welcome to the dark ages." Many copies of the original LP release also contained an uncensored picture of a nude model on the inner LP sleeve.

The cover art bears a resemblance to John Lennon's Some Time in New York City, an album that contains Lennon's controversial "Woman Is the Nigger of the World", a song Axl Rose cited when he defended his use of the word "nigger" in "One in a Million".

Controversy

In addition to the album cover, the song "One in a Million" caused significant controversy and raised accusations of racism and homophobia. Rose denied that he was a racist and defended his use of the word "nigger", claiming that "it's a word to describe somebody that is basically a pain in your life, a problem. The word nigger doesn't necessarily mean black." He cited the rap group N.W.A. and the John Lennon song "Woman Is the Nigger of the World" as other examples of musicians using the word. Several years later, Rose conceded that he had used the word as an insult towards black people who had tried to rob him, and because the word is a taboo. In response to the allegations of homophobia, Rose stated that he considered himself "pro-heterosexual" and blamed this attitude on "bad experiences" with gay men.

Reception

Rolling Stone, in a 4 out of 5 star review, stated "Given that Guns N' Roses could probably release an album of Baptist hymns at this point and go platinum, it would be all too easy to dismiss G n' R Lies as a sneaky attempt by the band to throw together some outtakes and cash in on the busy holiday buying season ... The good news is that Lies is a lot more interesting than that ... The calm folk-rock melodies of these four acoustic songs reveal yet another welcome facet of Guns N' Roses. They should also end any further mutterings from the doubting Thomases out there who are still making snide comments about the band's potential for longevity." Allmusic, in a 3.5 out of 5 review, criticized some of the songs on the acoustic side, stating "Constructed as a double EP, with the "indie" debut Live ?!*@ Like a Suicide coming first and four new acoustic-based songs following on the second side, G N' R Lies is where the band metamorphosed from genuine threat to joke. Neither recorded live nor released by an indie label, Live ?!*@ Like a Suicide is competent bar band boogie, without the energy or danger of Appetite for Destruction. The new songs are considerably more problematic. "Patience" is Guns N' Roses at their prettiest and their sappiest, the most direct song they recorded to date. Its emotional directness makes the misogyny of "Used to Love Her (But I Had to Kill Her)" and the pitiful slanders of "One in a Million" sound genuine.

In a negative review for The Village Voice, Robert Christgau stated "Axl's voice is a power tool with attachments, Slash's guitar a hype, the groove potent "hard rock", and the songwriting not without its virtues. So figure musical quality at around C plus and take the grade as a call to boycott, a reminder to clean livers who yearn for the wild side that the necessary link between sex-and-drugs and rock-and-roll is a Hollywood fantasy" while condemning "One In a Million" and "Used To Love Her".

In a 2014 review Metal Hammer dissected the controversy around the album, stating "Conceived as a stop-gap release, the second Guns N' Roses album remains a remarkable one-off – in every sense. Ultimate Classic Rock stated "Ironically, G N' R Lies' tabloid-style cover art also hinted at the incessant scandals and resulting paranoia that would soon engulf the band, and its singer in particular, sowing the seeds to their eventual dissolution after the twin Use Your Illusion behemoths, and protracted creative silence until 2008's historically delayed Chinese Democracy opus."

Track listing
Songwriting credits via ASCAP.

Personnel
Guns N' Roses
W. Axl Rose − lead vocals, piano, whistling
Slash − lead guitar, acoustic guitar
Izzy Stradlin − rhythm guitar, acoustic guitar, backing vocals
Duff "Rose" McKagan − bass, backing vocals
Steven Adler − drums

Additional musicians
West Arkeen − additional guitar, backing vocals on tracks 5–8
Howard Teman − percussion on tracks 5–8

Certifications

Accolades

See also
List of glam metal albums and songs

References

Guns N' Roses albums
1988 albums
Albums produced by Mike Clink
Geffen Records albums